Lesbian literature is a subgenre of literature addressing lesbian themes. It includes poetry, plays, fiction addressing lesbian characters, and non-fiction about lesbian-interest topics.

Fiction that falls into this category may be of any genre, such as historical fiction, science fiction, fantasy, horror, and romance.

Overview

Lesbian literature includes works by lesbian authors, as well as lesbian-themed works by heterosexual authors. Even works by lesbian writers that do not deal with lesbian themes are still often considered lesbian literature. Works by heterosexual writers which treat lesbian themes only in passing, on the other hand, are not often regarded as lesbian literature. 

The fundamental work of lesbian literature is the poetry of Sappho of Lesbos. From various ancient writings, historians have gathered that a group of young women were left in Sappho's charge for their instruction or cultural edification. Not much of Sappho's poetry remains, but that which does demonstrates the topics she wrote about: women's daily lives, their relationships, and rituals. She focused on the beauty of women and proclaimed her love for girls.

Certain works have established historical or artistic importance, and the world of lesbian fiction continues to grow and change as time goes on. Until recently, contemporary lesbian literature has been centered around several small, exclusively lesbian presses, as well as online fandoms. However, since the new millennium began, many lesbian presses have branched out to include the works of trans men and women, gay and bisexual voices, and other queer works not represented by the mainstream press.  Additionally, novels with lesbian themes and characters have become more accepted in mainstream publishing.

Early literature

Medieval Christian mysticism
The European Middle Ages lacked a specific term for lesbians, but medieval French texts, under the influence of the Arabic literature of the period, featured literary depictions of love and sexual desire between women. Such expressions are found in devotional texts to the Virgin Mary or the hagiography of Ida Louvain, by Beguines, or the writings of female Christian mystics, including Hildegarde of Bingen, Hadewijch, Margery Kempe, Mechtild of Magdeburg, and Marguerite Porete.

19th century: forerunners

In the early 19th century, Chinese poet Wu Tsao gained popularity for her lesbian love poems. Her songs, according to poet Kenneth Rexroth, were "sung all over China".

Though lesbian literature had not yet evolved as a distinct genre in English in the 19th century, lesbian writers like the essayist and supernatural fiction writer Vernon Lee sometimes hinted at lesbian subtexts in their work or, like Lee's lover Amy Levy, wrote love poems to women using the voice of a heterosexual man.  Others wrote, but kept their writing secret. Beginning in 1806, English landowner and mountaineer Anne Lister kept extensive diaries for 34 years, which included details of her lesbian relationships and seductions, with the lesbian sections written in secret code. The diaries were not published until the 1980s.  In 2010, they were the basis for a BBC television production, The Secret Diaries of Miss Anne Lister.

Twenty-first century writer and editor Susan Koppelman compiled an anthology titled Two Friends and Other 19th-century American Lesbian Stories: by American Women Writers, which includes stories by Constance Fenimore Woolson, Octave Thanet, Mary Eleanor Wilkins Freeman, Kate Chopin and Sarah Orne Jewett that were originally published in periodicals of their time. Of these stories, which range "from the explicit to inferentially lesbian", Koppelman said, "I recognize these stories as stories about women loving women in the variety of romantic ways that we wouldn't even have to struggle to define if we were talking about men and women loving each other."

Since the 1970s, scholars of lesbian literature have analyzed as lesbian relationships that would not have been labeled as such in the 19th century due to different conceptions of intimacy and sexuality. For example, Christina Rossetti's 1862 poem "Goblin Market" has been widely read as a narrative of lesbianism, even though it attempts to paint itself as a narrative of sisterly love. Scholars have also seen lesbian potential in characters such as Marian Halcombe in Wilkie Collins's 1859 novel The Woman in White. Marian is described as masculine and unattractive, and her motivation throughout the story is her love for her half-sister, Laura Fairlie.

Additionally, scholars have engaged in queer readings of the novels of Charlotte Brontë, particularly Shirley and Villette, in which the female main characters engage in close or even obsessive relationships with other women. Some have even speculated that Brontë herself may have been in love with her friend Ellen Nussey; Vita Sackville-West called the letters between the two "love letters pure and simple."

Scholars have similarly speculated on whether the 19th-century poet Emily Dickinson might have been in love with her sister-in-law, Susan Gilbert, a possibility that encourages queer readings of Dickinson's many love poems.

Michael Field was the pseudonym used by two British women, Katherine Bradley and Edith Cooper, who wrote poetry and verse-dramas together. Bradley was Cooper's aunt, and the two lived together as lovers from the 1870s to their deaths in 1913 and 1914. Their poetry often took their love as its subject, and they also wrote a book of poems for their dog, Whym Chow.

Certain canonical male authors of the 19th century also incorporated lesbian themes into their work. At the beginning of the century, Samuel Taylor Coleridge published his unfinished narrative poem "Christabel". Scholars have interpreted the interactions in this poem between the titular character and a stranger named Geraldine as having lesbian implications. Algernon Charles Swinburne became known for subject matter that was considered scandalous, including lesbianism and sadomasochism. In 1866, he published Poems and Ballads, which contained the poems "Anactoria" and "Sapphics" concerning Sappho of Lesbos and dealing explicitly with lesbian content. Finally, Henry James portrayed a Boston marriage, considered an early form of lesbian relationship, between the feminist characters Olive Chancellor and Verena Tarrant in his 1886 novel The Bostonians.

One of the more explicitly lesbian works of the 19th century is the Gothic novella Carmilla, by Joseph Sheridan Le Fanu, first published in serial form in 1871-72. Considered a precursor to and an inspiration for Bram Stoker's Dracula, Carmilla tells the story of the relationship between the innocent Laura and the vampire Carmilla, whose sucking of Laura's blood is clearly linked to an erotic attraction to Laura. This story has inspired many other works that take advantage of the trope of the lesbian vampire. It was also adapted into a YouTube webseries of the same name beginning in 2014.

Modern history

1900–1950:  Beginnings

The first novel in the English language recognised as having a lesbian theme is The Well of Loneliness (1928) by Radclyffe Hall, which a British court found obscene because it defended "unnatural practices between women". The book was banned in Britain for decades; this is in the context of the similar censorship of Lady Chatterley's Lover, which also had a theme of transgressive female sexuality, albeit heterosexual. In the United States, The Well of Loneliness survived legal challenges in New York and the U.S. Customs Court.

In 1923, Elsa Gidlow, born in England, published the first volume of openly lesbian love poetry in the United States, titled On a Grey Thread.

In the early 20th century, an increasingly visible lesbian community in Paris centered on literary salons hosted by French lesbians as well as expatriates like Nathalie Barney and Gertrude Stein, who produced lesbian-themed works in French and English, including Nightwood by Djuna Barnes,  Idyll Saphique by Liane de Pougy, poetry by Renee Vivien,  Barney's own epigrams, poetry, and several works by Stein.  Radclyffe Hall also spent time in Paris at Barney's salon and modeled one of her characters in The Well of Loneliness after her.

Japanese writer Nobuko Yoshiya was an important early 20th century author of stories about intense romance between young women, though her writing was accepted in mainstream culture because none of the relationships were consummated.

Virginia Woolf's 1928 novel of a high-spirited gender-bending poet who lives for centuries, Orlando, which was said to be based on her lover, Vita Sackville-West, was re-examined in the 1970s as a 'subversive' lesbian text.

Other examples of 1920s lesbian literature include poems by Amy Lowell about her partner of over a decade Ada Dwyer Russell. Lowell wanted to dedicate her books to Dwyer who refused as they had to hide the nature of their relationship except for one time in a non-poetry book in which Lowell wrote, "To A.D.R., This, and all my books. A.L." Examples of these love poems to Dwyer include the Taxi, Absence, In a Garden, Madonna of the Evening Flowers, Opal, and Aubade. Lowell admitted to John Livingston Lowes that Dwyer was the subject of her series of romantic poems titled "Two Speak Together". Lowell's poems about Dwyer have been called the most explicit and elegant lesbian love poetry during the time between the ancient Sappho and poets of the 1970s. Unfortunately, most of the primary document romantic letters of communication between the two were destroyed by Dwyer at Lowell's request, leaving much unknown about the details of their life together.

Most American literature of the 1930s, 40s, and early 50s presented lesbian life as tragedy, ending with either the suicide of the lesbian character or her conversion to heterosexuality. This was required so that the authorities did not declare the literature obscene. This would generally be achieved by placing the death or conversion in the last chapter or even paragraph. For example, The Stone Wall, a lesbian autobiography with an unhappy ending, was published in 1930 under the pseudonym Mary Casal. It was one of the first lesbian autobiographies. Yet as early as 1939, Frances V. Rummell, an educator and a teacher of French at Stephens College, published the first explicitly lesbian autobiography in which two women end up happily together, titled Diana: A Strange Autobiography. This autobiography was published with a note saying, "The publishers wish it expressly understood that this is a true story, the first of its kind ever offered to the general reading public". However, literary critics have since called the autobiography 'fictional'. 

Jane Bowles' only novel, Two Serious Ladies, published in 1943, told the story of a romance between an upper class woman and a prostitute in a run-down Panamanian port town.

1950 to 1970: Pulp fiction and beyond

Lesbian fiction in English saw a huge explosion in interest with the advent of the dime-store or pulp fiction novel. Lesbian pulp fiction became its own distinct category of fiction in the 1950s and 60s, although a significant number of authors of this genre were men using either a male or female pen name. Tereska Torrès is credited with writing the first lesbian pulp novel, Women's Barracks, a fictionalized story about women in the Free French Forces during World War II. The 1950 book sold 2 million copies in its first five years of publication. One notable female author of lesbian pulp fiction, who came out later in life as a lesbian, was Ann Bannon, who created the Beebo Brinker series.

The Price of Salt by Patricia Highsmith, considered the first lesbian novel with a happy ending, was groundbreaking for being the first where neither of the two women has a nervous breakdown, dies tragically, faces a lonely and desolate future, commits suicide, or returns to being with a male. The manuscript was rejected by Highsmith's publisher Harper & Brothers and published in hardcover by Coward-McCann in 1952 under the pseudonym "Claire Morgan", followed by the Bantam Books lesbian pulp fiction paperback in 1953. The paperback editions sold almost 1 million copies. In 1990, it was republished by Bloomsbury under Highmith's own name with the title changed to Carol  (the novel was adapted as the 2015 film of same name).

In the 1950s, parts of French author Violette leDuc's novel Ravages were censored because they contained explicit lesbian passages.  The deleted passages were published in the 1960s as Therese and Isabelle and made into the 1968 film of same title.

Jane Rule's Desert of the Heart was able to break out of the pulp fiction category when it was published as a hardback by Macmillan Canada in 1964. Several publishers turned it down beforehand however, with one telling Rule, "If this book isn't pornographic, what's the point of printing it?...if you can write in the dirty parts we'll take it but otherwise no". The novel was loosely adapted into the 1985 film Desert Hearts.

When publishing her novel Mrs. Stevens Hears the Mermaids Singing in 1965, the novelist May Sarton feared that writing openly about lesbianism would lead to a diminution of the previously established value of her work. "The fear of homosexuality is so great that it took courage to write Mrs. Stevens Hears the Mermaids Singing," she said, "to write a novel about a woman homosexual who is not a sex maniac, a drunkard, a drug-taker, or in any way repulsive, to portray a homosexual who is neither pitiable nor disgusting, without sentimentality ..."

The first English contemporary novelist to come out as a lesbian was Maureen Duffy, whose 1966 book Microcosm explored the subcultures of lesbian bars.

1970 to the present: Second wave feminism, mainstream acceptance, and diversification

The feminist movement in the late 1960s and early 1970s saw the development of a more politicized voice in lesbian literature and more mainstream acceptance of lesbian-themed literature that moved away from the 'tragic lesbian' theme that had dominated earlier works.  A pioneering autobiographical novel of this era was the picaresque 1973 novel Rubyfruit Jungle  by Rita Mae Brown, which became a national best-seller. Jill Johnston argued for lesbian separatism in her 1973 book Lesbian Nation. In the 1970s, the voices of American lesbians of color began to be heard, including works by Audre Lorde, Jewelle Gomez, Paula Gunn Allen, Cherrie Moraga, and Gloria Anzaldua. One of the foundational texts of black lesbian literature is Ann Allen Shockley’s novel, Loving Her. Published in 1974, Loving Her is widely considered to be one of the first, if not the first, published pieces of black lesbian literature. Joanna Russ's 1975 novel The Female Man contains an alternative universe inhabited solely by lesbians. The 1970s also saw the advent of feminist and LGBT publishing houses, such as Naiad Press, and literary magazines like Sinister Wisdom, and Conditions which published lesbian works. Adrienne Rich and Judy Grahn were important poets and essayists of the era. Patience and Sarah by Alma Routsong, published under the pen name "Isabel Miller" in 1971, examined the historical confines of a romance between two 19th century women in a Boston Marriage.

After the birth of an explicitly gay and lesbian literature in the 1970s, the following decades saw a tremendous rise in its production. While gay male novels had more crossover appeal and often became mid-list sellers in mainstream publishing houses; lesbian literature, depending on smaller presses, developed smaller but 'respectable' audiences.  In the 1980s, with the advent of sex-positive feminism, a few lesbian literary magazines began to specialize in more explicitly erotic work, such as On Our Backs, a satirical reference to the feminist 1970s magazine, Off Our Backs. The 1988 founding of the Lambda Literary Award, with several lesbian categories, helped increase the visibility of LGBT literature.

In the 1980s and 90s, lesbian literature diversified into genre literature, including fantasy, mystery, science fiction, romance, graphic novels, and young adult.

In 1983, Anita Cornwell wrote the first published collection of essays by an African-American lesbian, Black Lesbian in White America, published by Naiad Press.

The influence of late 20th century feminism and greater acceptance of LGBT work was felt in Mexico, with the emergence of lesbian poets Nancy Cardenas, Magaly Alabau, Mercedes Roffe, and others. In Argentina and Uruguay, Alejandra Pizarnik and Cristina Peri Rossi combined lesbian eroticism with artistic and sociopolitical concerns in their work.

In Asia, Singaporean playwright Eleanor Wong and Taiwanese writer Qiu Miaojin have written about lesbian relationships, as have Chinese writers Lin Bai and Chen Ran. Spinning Tropics by Aska Mochizuki, Beauty and Sadness by Yasunari Kawabata, Quicksand (卍 Manji) by Junichiro Tanizaki and Real World by Natsuo Kirino are all novels that explore lesbian love in Japan. Indian novelist Abha Dawesar's 2006 Babyji won a Stonewall Award and the Lambda Award.

In the 21st century, lesbian literature has emerged as a genre in Arabic speaking countries, with some novels, like Ana Hiya Anti (I Am You) by Elham Mansour, achieving best-seller status. This century has also brought more attention to African literary works and authors, such as Cameroonian novelist Frieda Ekotto and Ghanaian writer Ama Ata Aido.

Meanwhile, English-language novels which include lesbian characters or relationships have continued to garner national awards and mainstream critical acclaim, like The Color Purple (1982) by Alice Walker, Bastard out of Carolina (1992) by Dorothy Allison, The Hours (1998) by Michael Cunningham, Fingersmith (2002) by Sarah Waters and Lost and Found (2006) by Carolyn Parkhurst.

As literature including lesbian characters and relationships has become more accepted in mainstream Western society, some writers and literary critics have questioned why there needs to be a separate category for lesbian literature at all. "I've never understood why straight fiction is supposed to be for everyone, but anything with a gay character or that includes gay experience is only for queers," said Jeanette Winterson, author of the best-selling 1985 novel Oranges Are Not the Only Fruit.  Others have stressed the continuing need for LGBT-themed literature, especially for younger LGBT readers.

Young adult fiction

1970s
In Ruby (1976) by Rosa Guy, the main character is a girl from the West Indies. The novel tells the story of her relationship with another girl. Other young adult novels with lesbian characters and themes that were published during this time include Happy Endings Are All Alike (1978) by Sandra Scoppettone. According to the author, it "barely got reviewed and when it did it wasn't good", unlike Scoppettone's novel about gay boys, which was better received.

Frequent themes in books published during the 1970s are that homosexuality is a "phase", or that there are no "happy endings" for gay people, and that they generally lead a difficult life.

The School Library Journal reported:

Judy Blume has been cited as a catalyst in the 1970s for an increase in inclusion of "taboo" topics in children's literature, which include homosexuality.

1980s
Annie on My Mind (1982) by Nancy Garden tells the story of two high school girls who fall in love. The novel, which has never been out of print, was a step forward for homosexuality in young adult literature. It was published in hardback and by a major press. In the book, homosexuality is seen as something permanent and to be explored, not "fixed."

In Kansas, a minister led a public burning of Annie on My Mind following a controversy after it was donated to a school library.

1990s
During this decade the number of lesbian-themed young adult novels published rose. Nancy Garden published two novels with lesbian protagonists, Lark in the Morning (1991) and Good Moon Rising, and received positive sales and reviews. In 1994, M.E. Kerr published Deliver Us From Evie, about a boy with a lesbian sister, which was well received by the public. Other books published during this decade include Dive (1996) by Stacey Donovan, The Necessary Hunger (1997) by Nina Revoyr, The House You Pass On the Way (1997) by Jacqueline Woodson, Girl Walking Backwards (1998) by Bett Williams (who intended the novel for an adult audience though it was popular among teens), Hard Love (1999) by Ellen Wittlinger and Dare Truth or Promise (1999) by Paula Boock.

2000s
The 1990s represented a turning point for young adult novels that explored lesbian issues, and since 2000, a flood of such books has reached the market. The public attitude towards lesbian themes in young adult literature has grown more accepting.

In 2000, the School Library Journal included Annie on My Mind in its list of the top 100 most influential books of the century.

In the past, most books portrayed gay people as "living isolated lives, out of context with the reality of an amazingly active community." Today, books also show gay characters not as stigmatized and separate.

A popular young adult novel of 2012, The Miseducation of Cameron Post by Emily M. Danforth, tells the story of a 12-year-old girl who is sent to a de-gaying camp in Montana. In 2016, principal photography began on a film adaptation.

There are fewer books about female homosexuality than male homosexuality, and even fewer books on bisexuality are published. Despite the fact that availability of books with teen lesbian and bisexual themes has increased since the 1960s, books with non-white characters are still difficult to find. One exception is the 2021 young adult novel, Last Night at the Telegraph Club, which describes the coming-of-age of a teenage daughter of Chinese immigrants in 1950's San Francisco.

Publishers

The first lesbian publisher devoted to publishing lesbian and feminist books was Daughters, Inc. in Plainfield, Vermont, which published Rubyfruit Jungle by Rita Mae Brown in 1973. Naiad Press, followed, which published the seminal lesbian romance novel Curious Wine (1983) by Katherine V. Forrest and many other books. The press closed in 2003 after 31 years. Naiad co-founder Barbara Grier handed off her books and operation to a newly established press, Bella Books. Established in 2001, Bella Books acquired the Naiad Press backlist, including the majority of works by Jane Rule and all the works of Karin Kallmaker. Their catalog includes over 300 titles of lesbian romance, lesbian mystery and erotica.

Other early publishers include Spinsters Ink (which was sold a couple of times and now is part of the Bella Books organization), Rising Tide Press, Crossing Press, Onlywomen Press, Kitchen Table Press, and New Victoria. In many cases, these presses were operated by authors who also published with the publication house, such as Barbara Wilson at Seal Press, which became part of the mainstream company Avalon Publishing, and Joan Drury at Spinsters Ink.

The current largest publishers of lesbian fiction are Bella Books, Bold Strokes Books, Bywater Books, and Flashpoint Publications, which acquired Regal Crest Enterprises (RCE) in January 2021. Flashpoint Publications/RCE has a catalog of lesbian romance, lesbian mystery, some erotica, sci-fi, fantasy, and sagas currently exceeding 150 works. Bold Strokes Books, established in 2005, publishes lesbian and gay male mystery, thrillers, sci-fi, adventure, and other LGBT genre books, with a catalog including 130 titles. Alyson Books specialized in LGBT authors and published a number of lesbian titles.
 
Smaller publishers of exclusively lesbian fiction include Bedazzled Ink, Intaglio Publications, Launch Point Press, Sapphire Books Publishing, Supposed Crimes, Wicked Publishing, and Ylva Publishing. Some women's feminist presses also produce lesbian fiction, such as Firebrand Books and Virago Press.

Notable works

 The Well of Loneliness, Radclyffe Hall (1928)
 Nightwood, Djuna Barnes (1936)
 The Price of Salt, Patricia Highsmith (1952) – aka Carol (1990)
 Spring Fire, Vin Packer (1952)
 Rempart des Béguines, Françoise Mallet-Joris (1952)
 Chocolates for Breakfast, Pamela Moore (author) (1957)
 The Beebo Brinker Chronicles, Ann Bannon (1957–1962)
 Desert of the Heart, Jane Rule (1964)
 Patience & Sarah, Isabel Miller (1971)
 Rubyfruit Jungle, Rita Mae Brown (1973)
 The Color Purple, Alice Walker (1982)
 Annie on My Mind, Nancy Garden (1982)
 The Swashbuckler, Lee Lynch (1983)
 Oranges Are Not the Only Fruit, Jeanette Winterson (1985)
 Memory Board, Jane Rule (1985)
 Send My Roots Rain, Ibis Gómez-Vega (1991)
 Along the Journey River, Carole LaFavor (1996)
 Memory Mambo, Achy Obejas (1996)
 Tipping the Velvet, Sarah Waters (1998)
 Fingersmith, Sarah Waters (2002)
 Garis Tepi Seorang Lesbian, Herlinatiens (2003)
 Southland, Nina Revoyr (2003)
 Stone Butch Blues, Leslie Feinberg (1993)
 Sugar Rush, Julie Burchill (2004)
 Ash, Malinda Lo (2009)

Notable authors (alphabetically)

 Sarah Aldridge
 Ann Bannon
 Natalie Barney
 Alison Bechdel
 Rita Mae Brown
 Julie Burchill
 Jessie Chandler
 Abha Dawesar
 Ellen DeGeneres
 Emma Donoghue
 Sarah Dreher
 Lillian Faderman
 Katherine V. Forrest
 Jocelyne François
 Jeanne Galzy
 Nancy Garden
 Alicia Gaspar de Alba
 Ibis Gómez-Vega
 Nicola Griffith
 Rosa Guy
 Radclyffe Hall
 Bertha Harris
 Ellen Hart
 Karin Kallmaker
 Lori L. Lake
 Violette Leduc
 Carole LaFavor
 Malinda Lo
 Audre Lorde
 Lee Lynch
 Ann-Marie MacDonald
 Marijane Meaker; also published under the pseudonyms of:
 Ann Aldrich
 Mary James
 M. E. Kerr
 Vin Packer
 Laura Winston
 Val McDermid
 Qiu Miaojin
 Achy Obejas
 Julie Anne Peters
 Radclyffe (who also publishes as L. L. Raand)
 Mary Renault
 Nina Revoyr
 Adrienne Rich
 Jane Rule
 Joanna Russ
 Sappho
 May Sarton
 Sarah Schulman
 Sandra Scoppettone
 Merry Shannon
 Elizabeth Sims
 Gertrude Stein
 tatiana de la tierra
 Michelle Tea
 Valerie Taylor
 Tereska Torrès 
 Wu Tsao
 Renee Vivien
 Ebine Yamaji
 Nobuko Yoshiya 
 Sarah Waters
 Jeanette Winterson
 Monique Wittig
 Jacqueline Woodson
 Samar Yazbek

See also

 Black lesbian literature
 Lambda Literary Award for Lesbian Fiction
 Lesbian pulp fiction
 Yuri (genre)
 List of lesbian fiction
 List of poets portraying sexual relations between women
 Bisexual literature (includes lesbian, gay and heterosexual encounters)
 Gay literature (historically, the term "gay literature" was often used to cover both gay male and lesbian literature)
 LGBT themes in speculative fiction (includes lesbian, gay, bisexual, and transgender literature)
 List of LGBT-themed speculative fiction (includes lesbian, gay, bisexual, and transgender themed speculative fiction)

Notes

References

Further reading
 
 
 
 
 
 

Thesis

External links
  Lesbian Literature at Goodreads
  Lesbian Literature at Bywater Books (lesbian books publisher, founded 2004)
  Lesbian Literature at Sapphire Books (lesbian books publisher, founded 2010) 
  Lesbian Literature at Golden Crown Literary Society
  Lesbian Fiction at Wicked Publishing (includes lesbian literature, founded 2016)
  Lesbian Mysteries at Bee Cliff Press (archive)
  Lesbian Books at The Lesbian Review (book reviews and recommendations)
 Lesbians Over Everything (lesbian stories and reviews platform)
  Lesbian Literature by Penelope J. Engelbrecht, from Women's Studies Encyclopedia, 1999, vol. 2, pp. 852–856, Greenwood Press (2002) (archive)
  The Lesbian in Literature by Barbara Grier, 1981, (3rd ed.), Naiad Press, at OutHistory

 
History of literature